Townsendiellomyia is a genus of flies in the family Tachinidae.

Species
T. nidicola Townsend, 1908

References

Diptera of Europe
Diptera of North America
Exoristinae
Tachinidae genera